Linda Ann Loo (born 1947) is a Canadian lawyer and judge.

Biography and career
Loo was born in 1947 in Vancouver, British Columbia, Canada. Loo finished undergraduate studies in 1971 and received her law degree from the University of British Columbia in 1974. She began practicing law as in-house counsel at BC Hydro for 12 years. In 1986 Loo became an associate with the law firm Singleton Urquhart, later rising to the position as a managing partner of the firm. As a civil litigator Loo argued, and won a case before the Supreme Court of Canada.

She is also a former Law Society Bencher and Trial Lawyers Association of British Columbia Board member. On September 24, 1996, on the recommendation of the Lieutenant Governor of British Columbia David Lam and then Governor-General Roméo LeBlanc, Loo was appointed an associate justice of the Supreme Court of British Columbia. She continues to serve to this day as one of 109 justices.

References

1947 births
Canadian lawyers
Canadian people of Chinese descent
Canadian women judges
Canadian women lawyers
Judges in British Columbia
Lawyers in British Columbia
Living people
Peter A. Allard School of Law alumni
People from Vancouver
University of British Columbia alumni